Sudu Sewaneli (Shadows of White) is a 2002 Sri Lankan Sinhala drama film directed and produced by Sunil Ariyaratne for Charudatta Films. It is based on a sinhala novel of the same name written by Piyadasa Welikannage. It stars Linton Semage and Vasanthi Chathurani in lead roles along with Roshan Pilapitiya and Kanchana Mendis. Music composed by Rohana Weerasinghe. It is the 980th Sri Lankan film in the Sinhala cinema. The film won eight awards including the Best Film and the Best Lyricist at Sarasaviya Festival 2003.

Plot
The story revolves around a rural family of the year 1848, where many national heroes started their rebels against British rule including Veera Puran Appu.

Cast
 Vasanthi Chathurani as Podi Menike
 Roshan Pilapitiya as Heen Banda
 Linton Semage as Sudu Banda
 Iranganie Serasinghe
 Kanchana Mendis
 Nihal Fernando
 Quintus Weerakoon
 Edward Gunawardena
 G.R Perera
 Hemasiri Liyanage
 Vasantha Vittachchi
 Jagath Benaragama

Production
The film has been shot around Matale, Melsiripura, Galle Fort, Wadduwa Church and some scenes of old Colombo.

Soundtrack

References

2002 films
2000s Sinhala-language films
Films set in British Ceylon